Burton Kramer  (born 1932) is a Canadian graphic designer and artist who lives and works in Toronto.

Early life and education 
Kramer was born in 1932 in New York City. He graduated with a BSc From The Institute of Design, Chicago in Visual Communication and an MFA in Graphic Design from Yale University.

Career
Kramer began working in the late 1950s for Will Burtin, then as Assistant Art Director of "The Architectural Record", for Geigy Chemical and Pharmaceuticals In Ardsley, New York, and then as Art Director at the Erwin Halpern advertising agency in Zurich, Switzerland. He moved to Toronto in late 1965 and his work was prominent at Expo 67, where he designed the map - directory system, among other contributions. His work from this period shows the influence of Op Art. He has pieces featured in the Smithsonian Institution and the Library of Congress. He has archives of his work in the collections of the Royal Ontario Museum, Toronto, and the Vignelli Center at Rochester Institute of Technology. 

 
He is well known for designing the distinctive 1974 Canadian Broadcasting Corporation logo, consisting of a stylized letter "C" (for Canada) radiating in all directions, representing broadcasting. In 1966-67, he was Director of Corporate Design for Clairtone, redesigning their logo and many other aspects of their graphic identity. 

In late 1967 he founded Kramer Design Associates Limited, a multi-media firm specializing in corporate I.D. Programs, signage systems and print. Kramer was a professor at the Ontario College of Art and Design (part-time faculty) for 21 years, lectured at universities in Mexico, Canada, the US and Switzerland. He has been a member of AGI. Alliance Graphique Internationale and an Academician of the Royal Canadian Academy of Art since 1974. He is listed in Who's Who in American Art, Canadian Who's Who, Who's who in The World, and many others. Kramer is currently active as an artist, showing his geometric abstractions at galleries in Canada and abroad.

Honours 
Kramer was awarded GDC Fellowship in 1975. He was made a member of the Order of Ontario in 2002, the first graphic designer to be inducted into the order. He received an honorary Doctorate (D.Des.) from the Ontario College of Art & Design in 2003. In 2015 he was awarded the Art Directors and Designers of Canada Usherwood Lifetime Achievement Award. In 2018 he received The Order of Canada C.M.

References

External links 
 Official website
 Centre for Contemporary Canadian Art: Database of Design Work
 Centre for Contemporary Canadian Art: Database of Art Work

1932 births
Canadian graphic designers
Living people
Members of the Order of Canada
Members of the Order of Ontario
Artists from Ontario